Cadambi Minakshi (12 September 1905 – 3 March 1940) was an Indian historian and expert on Pallava history. In 1936, she became the first woman to get a doctorate from the University of Madras.

Early life and education

Minakshi was born in Madras on 12 September 1905 to Cadambi Balakrishnan, a bench clerk in the Madras High Court and his wife, Mangalammal. Balakrishnan died when Minakshi was young and Mangalammal took care of the family. Minakshi was interested in history from an early age and visited historic sites as Mannargudi, Pudukkottai, Villuppuram and Kanchipuram.

On completion of her schooling Minakshi joined the Women's Christian College in Madras, graduating in 1929. She wanted to her master's degree at Madras Christian College but her candidature was initially rejected on grounds of being a woman. However, Minakshi persisted and the authorities relented when her eldest C. Lakshminarayanan, who was working as a Professor in the college gave a written undertaking to take care of her. Minakshi eventually completed her master's degree and went on to pursue her doctorate obtaining it in 1936. Her doctoral thesis on "Administration and Social life under the Pallavas" was published in 1938 by the University of Madras as a part of a history series by eminent historian K. A. Nilakanta Sastri. The Madras daily The Hindu describes the book as "the eminently successful piece of research and is one of the best of a valuable series".

Career and research 

Soon after obtaining her doctorate in 1936, Minakshi started looking for a job. She was, initially turned down by the All India Radio and other organizations she applied for. Finally, in 1939, Sir Mirza Ismail, the Diwan of the Mysore kingdom offered her a job as Assistant Professor at the Maharani College in Bangalore.

Death 

Minakshi fell ill a few months after moving to Bangalore and died on 3 March 1940 at the age of 34. Condoling her death, the historian K. A. Nilakanta Sastri wrote to her mother in July 1941:

Works

References 

 

1905 births
1940 deaths
20th-century Indian historians
Madras Christian College alumni
Dravidologists
20th-century Indian women scientists
20th-century Indian social scientists
University of Madras alumni
Tamil scientists
Scientists from Chennai
Pallava dynasty
Scientists from Bangalore
Historians of India
Indian women historians
Women educators from Tamil Nadu
Educators from Tamil Nadu